Founded in 2005, Acne Paper was a bi-annual culture magazine and the publishing arm of the Stockholm-based creative collective and fashion label Acne Studios (Ambition to Create Novel Expression). The magazine existed between 2005 and 2014.

History and profile
The founder and editor at large of Acne Paper was Jonny Johansson. The headquarters of the magazine was in Stockholm, and it had an office in Paris.

Aiming to merge the historical with the contemporary, each issue of Acne Paper evolved around a key theme with the purpose of representing all creative practices in the context of history, philosophy, science, journalism, and other academia. Textual content consisted of interviews, prose, poems, and essays that together with fashion editorial, visual portfolios, and artwork formulates its approach to the creative industry and its cultural voice and expression. By creating a high-profile publishing product in an A3 ISO 216 format, Acne Paper was part of revolutionizing brand communication as Acne does not advertise or market itself in traditional fashion media such as editorial campaigns.

The New York Times’ Cathy Horyn writes “Acne Paper, under the editorship of Thomas Persson, is fast becoming one of the best little fashion magazines ... the envy of mainstream glossies".. As well as "The appeal of Acne Paper was the unfettered blend of the new and the nostalgic, except it doesn’t feel like nostalgia in this context. Maybe it just feels free".. Eric Wilson, also of The New York Times writes “Acne Paper, has also become a cult hit, like Andy Warhol's Interview in the early days, for its insider perspective on the most obscure corners of fashion and its wealth of big-name contributors".. Susannah Frankel of The Independent writes "There is an organic and authentic quality to Acne Paper, a sense of it extending above and beyond an obviously commercially viable concern, which is genuinely inspiring.".

In 2006 Acne Paper was exhibited at the Visionaire Gallery in New York as part of their MEGAZINES exhibition. In 2008 Acne Paper No 4 Playfulness won the D&AD award for Magazine and Newspaper Design – Entire Magazines, Magazine and Newspaper Design Front Cover, Typography – Magazine and Newspaper Design Homage as well as Photography – Magazine and Newspaper Design Homage.

The last issue of Acne Paper was #15 published in 2014.

Themes of issues
 No 1 The City
 No 2 Escapism
 No 3 Education
 No 4 Playfulness
 No 5 Elegance
 No 6 Exoticism
 No 7 Tradition
 No 8 Eroticism
 No 9 Art/Spirituality
 No 10 Legendary Parties
 No 11 The Artist's Studio
 No 12 Youth
 No 13 The Body
 No 14 Manhattan
 No 15 The Actress
 No 16 The Age of Aquarius

References

External links
Acne Paper website
Acne Studios website

2005 establishments in Sweden
2014 disestablishments in Sweden
Biannual magazines
Defunct magazines published in Sweden
Fashion magazines
Magazines established in 2005
Magazines disestablished in 2014
Magazines published in Stockholm
Swedish-language magazines